The Jabalpur Metro, also known as Jabalpur Metro Rail, is a rapid transit system proposed for the city of Jabalpur in Jabalpur Metropolitan Region in the Indian state of Madhya Pradesh. The project was announced by state Chief Minister Shivraj Singh Chouhan on 13 March 2014. The feasibility of this project was being questioned through a study. The work for the feasibility report has been completed in December 2017 and report was released in January 2018.

Routes
The Jabalpur Metro, under Jabalpur Metro Rail Corporation will run in 5 routes under 5 phases as proposed by Madhya Pradesh State Government. They are as follows: -
Phase 1:- Howbagh Jabalpur to  Gwarighat via Panchsheel Nagar.
Phase 2:- Jabalpur Railway Station to Neemkheda via Cantonment, Tilhari & Saliwada.
Phase 3:- Madan Mahal Railway Station to Jabalpur Airport via Dumna Nature Reserve Park. 
Phase 4:- Madan Mahal Railway Station to Kachnar City via Garha Police Station. 
PHase 5:- Kachhpura Railway Station to Tilwara Ghat via ISKON Jabalpur

References

Proposed rapid transit in India
Transport in Jabalpur